Broad Sound is a passage north from Casco Bay through the islands northwest of Portland, Maine. It lies between Chebeague Island and Harpswell Neck.

References 
 

Bodies of water of Cumberland County, Maine
Sounds of Maine